He Yi may refer to:

 He Yi (Yellow Turban rebel)
 He Yi (rower)
 He Jianjun, Chinese film director and screenwriter, occasionally credited under the name He Yi